The Republic of Ireland women's national football team represents the Republic of Ireland in competitions such as the FIFA Women's World Cup and the UEFA Women's Championship. The Republic of Ireland has qualified for the 2023 FIFA Women's World Cup. It has taken part in invitational tournaments such as the Algarve Cup, the Istria Cup and the Cyprus Cup. It is organised by the Women's Football Association of Ireland.

History
In 1973, the Women's Football Association of Ireland was established and in the same year on 13 May the Republic of Ireland made their official international debut, Paula Gorham's hat-trick securing a 3–2 win in an away friendly game against Wales. They made their competitive debut on 19 September 1982 in a 1984 European Competition for Women's Football qualifier against Scotland. This time the Republic of Ireland lost 3–0. On 2 October 1982 the Republic of Ireland gained their first competitive win when they defeated Northern Ireland 2–1 in an away game in the same competition. After losing 10–0 to Sweden in a Euro 1993 qualifier, the FAI did not enter a team in the 1995 competition. This defeat against Sweden remains the team's biggest defeat.

During the 2000s the Republic of Ireland enjoyed some minor successes. In 2000 they won the Celt Cup – a four team tournament that also featured Northern Ireland, Scotland and the Isle of Man. In their 2005 UEFA Women's Euro campaign they also won their second level group, finishing above Romania, Croatia, Bosnia and Herzegovina and Malta. This would have secured promotion to the elite group of nations which competed directly for qualification to major tournaments, had the two level system not been scrapped for the next qualifying campaign. The Republic of Ireland also won their group at the 2013 Cyprus Cup, finishing above South Korea, South Africa and Northern Ireland.

The Republic of Ireland has also enjoyed some success at both under-17 and under-19 levels. In 2010, with a team that included Megan Campbell, Ciara Grant, Dora Gorman, Denise O'Sullivan, Siobhán Killeen and Clare Shine, the Republic of Ireland U-17 squad were runners-up in the 2010 UEFA Women's Under-17 Championship and quarter-finalists in the 2010 FIFA U-17 Women's World Cup. In the UEFA championship semi-final the Republic of Ireland defeated Germany 1–0. With a team that included Megan Connolly, Savannah McCarthy and Katie McCabe the Republic of Ireland team won their group at the 2014 UEFA Women's Under-19 Championship and qualified for the semi-finals.

In April 2017, the squad demanded better treatment from the FAI and threatened to boycott a home match against Slovakia. They wanted a higher match fee, and broken time payment for amateurs missing work. They claimed that they had to share with underage teams the tracksuits they wore travelling to and from away matches, and change out of them in airport toilets. The boycott threat was lifted when agreement on improvements was reached.

In November 2021 the team recorded their biggest ever win: 11–0 against Georgia in the qualifiers for 2023 World Cup. After beating Finland 1–0 later in the qualifying campaign, Ireland reached a historic milestone as the team qualified to the playoffs for the first time in its history.

This achievement was soon surpassed when Ireland won the play-off final 1–0 over Scotland in Glasgow on 11 October 2022 to qualify for the final tournament.
A crucial first-half penalty save from Courtney Brosnan kept Ireland alive before Donegal native Amber Barrett scored the decisive goal, days after news of an explosion that killed several people in her county. She dedicated the goal to the victims and the community. While celebrating in the Hampden changing rooms, several players sang Celtic Symphony praising the Irish Republican Army, for which manager Vera Pauw and players Áine O'Gorman and Chloe Mustaki apologised; the chanting was condemned by politicians from Northern Ireland. The FAI was fined €20,000 for the chanting.

Team image

Home stadium
Throughout their history the Republic of Ireland have played their home games at various grounds. The most regularly used have included Dalymount Park, Tolka Park, Richmond Park and Turners Cross. They have also played occasional games at Belfield Park, Carlisle Grounds, Ferrycarrig Park, Flancare Park and in Arklow. However, since September 2013 they have played all their home games at Tallaght Stadium.

Results and fixtures

The following is a list of match results in the last 12 months, as well as any future matches that have been scheduled.

Legend

2022

2023

Coaching staff

Current coaching staff
The senior women's management team includes:

Manager history
  Eamonn Darcy (1984–1985)
  Fran Rooney (1986–1991)
  Linda Gorman (1991–1992)
  Mick Cooke (1992–2000)
  Noel King (2000–2010)
  Susan Ronan (2010–2016)
  Colin Bell (2017–2019)
  Vera Pauw (2019–)

Players

Current squad
 The following 25 players were named to the squad for a friendly match against China on 22 February 2023.
 Caps and goals updated as of 22 February 2023 after the match against .

Recent call-ups
 The following players have also been called up to the Republic of Ireland squad within the last 12 months.Notes:INJ Withdrew from squad due to injury
PRE Preliminary squad / standby
RET Player retired from the national team

RecordsStatistics correct as of 23 October 2020.
Active players in bold.

Most caps

Most goals

Competitive record
FIFA Women's World Cup*Draws include knockout matches decided on penalty kicks.UEFA Women's Championship*Draws include knockout matches decided on penalty kicks.''

See also

Sport in Republic of Ireland
Football in Republic of Ireland
Women's football in Republic of Ireland
Republic of Ireland women's national under-19 football team
Republic of Ireland women's national under-17 football team
Republic of Ireland men's national football team

Notes

References

External links

Republic of Ireland women's national football team @www.fai.ie
Republic of Ireland women's national football team @www.fifa.com

 
Ireland
Women's association football in the Republic of Ireland
Irish republicans